Stormin' the Castle is a bikers rally held in the north east of England at Witton Castle.

Stormin' celebrated its 25th year in 2015, whilst run independently and voluntarily, is one of the main fund raising events for the Motorcycle Action Group and over the last 24 years has been a major donator to support the ongoing fight for rider’s rights.

Along with Nabbed, Bulldog Bash, and The Farmyard, Stormin' is one of the biggest biker rallies in the UK. The rally has played host to many popular bands including Levellers, UFO, Hayseed Dixie, Stranglers and Terrorvision. Usually there are some cover bands as well.

Entertainment is spread across 2 stages, Main stage, and the smaller Iris tent. The Iris tent has a more laid back atmosphere with a mixture of Blues, R&B, Folk and Prog. The festival also offers a fairground, traders and caterers stalls across the site. The festival has resulted in complaints from local residents who have found the music to be anti-socially loud, but the bikers do not seem to care that they affect other people, even though they acknowledge that the bike rally is extremely loud.

There are significant limitations on disabled access: limited permits are available for disabled (blue badge) parking and the website discourages attendance by disabled people.

Event information 
General adult weekend entry is usually priced at around £45 and includes camping as well. The rally usually opens at 9 am every year. It is customary that on Fridays, visitors are only able to access the camping fields only.

Usual event opening hours 
Friday: Open 12:00

Saturday: Open 10:00

Sunday: Open 09:00

Motorcycle Trophy categories 

 Best in Show
 Best Custom
 Best Engineering
 Best Streetfighter
 Best Paintwork Best Classic (pre ’85)
 Exhibitor’s Choice
 Best Three Wheeler
 Best Alternative
 Best British 
 Best Japanese

References

Motorcycle rallies in the United Kingdom